All About George is a family sitcom which follows the extended family of George Kinsey (Rik Mayall). The show includes five generations, from George's grandmother (Edna Doré) to his first granddaughter, Jasmine. Only one series was made and aired in 2005.

Characters 

George Kinsey - (Rik Mayall) The main character of the program. We follow his life including the ups and downs of having 4 children, an annoying younger brother, a granddaughter, a grandmother and a father who is also his boss. Father to Laura, Amy and Ben.

Anne 'Annie' Kinsey (née McAlister) - (Julia Ford) Wife of George Kinsey and mother to Russell and Ben.

Gordon Kinsey - (Jack Shepherd) George's and Dave's father and Boss, husband to Kate and Lilly's only son. He runs the family business - Kinsey and Sons - who are contractors.

Kate Kinsey - (Gemma Jones) Wife to Gordon and mother to George and Dave.

Lilly Kinsey - (Edna Doré) The eldest in the family tree - Gordon's Mother.

Evelyn Kinsey -  (Penny Downie) George's first wife and mother to both Laura and Amy.

Laura Kinsey - George's and his first wife, Evelyn's eldest daughter. She is also mother to Jasmine.

Amy Kinsey - George's and his first wife, Evelyn's youngest daughter.

Russell Kinsey - Annie's eldest son.

Ben Kinsey - George's and Annie's youngest and only child together.

External links

British comedy television shows
ITV comedy
2005 British television series debuts
2005 British television series endings
2000s British sitcoms